San Baltasar, King Baltasar Cambá or San Baltazar is a folk saint of African origin, widely venerated in the coastal area of Argentina in the province of Corrientes, northeast of Santa Fe and east of Chaco and Formosa. The worship of San Baltasar is considered a para-liturgical cult, known as the Brotherhood of San Baltazar, since the Catholic Church has not canonized nor recognized Baltasar as a saint. San Baltasar appears as a crowned black man wearing a red robe or cloak and carrying a scepter or a staff.

San Baltasar's feast day is 6 January, when devotees dance and play music in his honor, most commonly candombe. In Concepción, Tucumán, Argentina, there are activities such as religious worship and musical entertainment offerings. This place called the South Island of San Baltasar, is an architectural ensemble consisting of the church with the image of the saint. He is the unofficial patron saint of Fernando de la Mora, a town in Paraguay.

See also
 Balthazar, one of the Three Wise Men.

References

Notes

Bibliography
Cirio, Norberto Pablo (2000). "Historical origins of the cult of San Baltazar in Argentina: The Brotherhood of San Baltazar and Animas (1772-1856)." Latin American Music Review 21 (2): 190–214. Latin American Music Review 21 (2): 190–214. Austin: University of Texas.
(2002a). "Practice music in worship African origin to St Baltazar. The charanda of Stoned (Province of Corrientes, Argentina)." Revista Musical Chilena 197. Santiago de Chile: Universidad de Chile (in press).

Religion in Argentina
Folk saints
Argentine folklore
Afro-Argentine culture